"Fresh Air" is a 1970 song written by Gary Duncan, lyrics by Jesse Oris Farrow, the pen name of Chester William "Chet" Powers, Jr., who also used the stage name of Dino Valenti.  It was first recorded by the San Francisco-based band Quicksilver Messenger Service, which Valenti had recently rejoined. "Fresh Air" was the only single released from the album Just for Love. The single peaked on November 7, 1970 at No. 49 during a nine-week stay on the Billboard Hot 100, making it the band's most successful single.

The song was recorded as part of the sessions for the Just for Love album between May and June, 1970. Both this and the follow up album What About Me were recorded during the band's relocation to Hawaii. Matthew Gruenwald of Allmusic opined that the song featured some of John Cipollina's best guitar work. In concert, the song was used to open the set.

References

1970 singles
Capitol Records singles
Songs written by Chet Powers
Quicksilver Messenger Service songs